The Kalar Range is a mountain range in Zabaykalsky Krai and the NW end of Amur Oblast, Russian Federation.

The range is part of the Udokan Ore Region that includes the Kodar and Udokan ranges.

History
Located in a desolate area, the Kalar Range was first described and roughly put on the map in 1857 by A.F. Usoltsev, Lieutenant of the Corps of Military Topographers of the Russian Imperial Army. Usoltsev sighted the range from the right bank of the Kalar River.

Geography
The Kalar Range belongs to the Stanovoy Highlands. To the north it borders the Chara depression —in the upper reaches of the Chara river, and the western spurs of the Udokan Range. 
To the south the range is bound by the valley of the Kalar river, a right tributary of the Vitim, which separates it from the Yankan Range.
While peaks in the western part are generally flat-topped, the eastern end has a more marked alpine relief.

Hydrography
A number of rivers have their sources in the range, including the Kalar river, with its right tributaries Katugin, Chukundu and Bugungda. Also the right tributaries of the Vitim river, Taksimo and Kuanda, the left tributaries of the Olyokma, Tas-Yuryah and Imangra, as well as several right tributaries of the Chara, also a left tributary of the Olyokma. River Nyukzha flows across the range in its eastern part.

Flora
The higher slopes of the range are mainly covered with sparse coniferous forest, while below  to  mountain larch taiga predominates.

See also
Baikal Rift Zone
List of mountains and hills of Russia

References

Stanovoy Highlands
Mountain ranges of Russia
Mountain ranges of Amur Oblast
Mountains of Zabaykalsky Krai